Lati Grobman is a Hollywood film producer.

She acted as the producer and executive producer of several films, such as The Iceman (2012), Texas Chainsaw 3D (2013) and Eliza Graves (2014).

In May 2005, Grobman signed a nonexclusive three-picture production deal with producer Avi Lerner's Millennium Films company estimated between $7 million-$15 million according to Variety.

In 2011, Grobman partnered up with actress/producer Christa Campbell to form Campbell-Grobman Films, which has produced numerous films, such as Texas Chainsaw 3D (2005), The Iceman (2012), and Straight A's (2013).

In 2014, Lati's film Brave Miss World (2013), received an Emmy nomination for Exceptional Merit in Documentary Filmmaking.

Her recent projects include Criminal, starring Tommy Lee Jones, Kevin Costner and Gary Oldman.

Campbell-Grobman Films
Founded by executives Christa Campbell and Lati Grobman, Campbell-Grobman Films has proven to be an aggressive force in the filmmaking community. In the past 18 months, they have produced seven films for multiple companies across Hollywood, including such high profile projects as Texas Chainsaw 3D and The Iceman, starring Michael Shannon and Winona Ryder. Driven by their passion for film, Christa and Lati enjoy working within a wide spectrum of genres, ranging from horror to romantic comedy, action, and documentary. Their films have been showcased in several renowned film festivals across the world, including Toronto, Venice, Montreal, and WorldFest-Houston, where their documentary film The Resort took home the Special Jury Award. Utilizing their combined experiences both behind and in front of the camera, this team ultimately aspires to create movies that can change the world for the better.

Personal life 
Grobman was born in Russia. She is the daughter of Israeli painter Michail Grobman and art magazine editor Irena Grobman, and sister to Israeli architect Yasha Jacob Grobman.

Producer

External links 

Grobman deal at Millennium Variety, Thursday, March 17, 2005
Grobman at MSN movies
Grobman on The New York Times
item on Lati Grobman on Maariv, Israeli paper 
Day of the Dead Remake Collider
Criminal Film Hollywood Reporter
Brave Miss World Film

Living people
Israeli emigrants to the United States
Israeli Jews
Israeli film producers
American film producers
Year of birth missing (living people)
Soviet emigrants to Israel